The 2016 World RX of Hockenheim was the second round of the third season of the FIA World Rallycross Championship. The event was held at the Hockenheimring in Hockenheim, Baden-Württemberg, alongside the Deutsche Tourenwagen Masters.

Supercar

Heats

* Timmy Hansen was excluded from Q4 and later disqualified from the whole event due to his car being underweight.

Semi-finals
Semi-Final 1

Semi-Final 2

Final

RX Lites

Heats

Semi-finals
Semi-Final 1

Semi-Final 2

Final

‡Olofsson could not make the final and as a result the stewards permitted Westlund to replace him.

Standings after the event

Supercar standings

RX Lites standings

 Note: Only the top five positions are included for both sets of standings.

References

External links

|- style="text-align:center"
|width="35%"|Previous race:2016 World RX of Portugal
|width="30%"|FIA World Rallycross Championship2016 season
|width="35%"|Next race:2016 World RX of Belgium
|- style="text-align:center"
|width="35%"|Previous race:2015 World RX of Hockenheim
|width="30%"|World RX of Hockenheim
|width="35%"|Next race:2017 World RX of Hockenheim
|- style="text-align:center"

Hockenheim
World RX, Hockenheim
World RX of Hockenheim